Koth is a village in Ahmedabad district of Gujarat, India. It is located in the Dholka taluka.

According to 2011 census of India, the population is 10,439.

References 

Villages in Ahmedabad district
Settlements in Gujarat